Leaving Eden may refer to:

 Leaving Eden (Antimatter album), 2007
 Leaving Eden (Brandon Heath album), 2011
 Leaving Eden (Brandon Heath song), from the album of the same name.
 Leaving Eden (Carolina Chocolate Drops album), 2012